Charles Maudru (1859-1935) was a French film director of the silent era. He was the father of the screenwriter Pierre Maudru.

Selected filmography
 Serge Panine (1922)
 The King of Paris (1923)
 The Loves of Rocambole (1924)

References

Bibliography
 Goble, Alan. The Complete Index to Literary Sources in Film. Walter de Gruyter, 1999.

External links

1859 births
1935 deaths
French film directors